Pelodosotis is an extinct lepospondyl amphibian.

References
Carroll, R. L., 1988: Vertebrate paleontology and evolution. W. H. Freeman and company, New York, 1988, 698

Ostodolepids
Permian amphibians of North America
Permian amphibians